One is an album by American jazz pianist Ahmad Jamal featuring 1978 performances and released on 20th Century Fox in 1979.

Track listing 
 "One (Ahad)" - (Sigidi Abdullah, Welton Gite): David Crawford (flute & alto flute), Mike Melvoin (poly Moog & Minimoog), Jamal, John Rowin (guitar), Chuck Rainey (bass), Roger Barthelemy (drums), Bill Summers (bongos & percussion). Conducted and arranged by Sigidi.
 "Just The Way You Are" - (Billy Joel): Mike Melvoin (poly Moog synthesizer), Jamal, John Rowin & Mario Henderson (guitar), John Heard (bass), Scotty Edwards (electric bass), Andre Fisher (drums), Shondu Rondo Akeim (congas), Geoff Howe (percussion).
 "Jet" - (Bennie Benjamin, Harry Revel, George David Weiss): Jamal, John Rowin & Mario Henderson (electric guitar), Scotty Edwards (bass), Andre Fisher (drums), Shondu Rondo Akeim (congas), Paulinho Da Costa (percussion). Horn section arranged and conducted by Mike Melvoin; Rhythm section arranged by Richard Evans and directed by Sigidi.
 "Black Cow" - (Walter Becker, Donald Fagen): Jamal (clavinet), John Rowin (guitar), Scotty Edwards (bass), Steve Bowling (Fender Rhodes), Roger Barthelemy (drums), Bill Summers (conga), Hal Blaine (percussion), Eloise Laws, Stephanie Spruill, Virginia Ayers (vocals). Conducted and arranged by Sigidi; Horns arranged and conducted by Mike Melvoin.
 "Dynamo" - (Jamal): Jamal, Calvin Keys (guitar), John Heard (bass), Eddie Marshall (drums), Kenny Nash (congas), Hal Blaine (percussion).
 "Sumayah" - (Jamal): Jamal.
 "Festival" - (Jamal): Jamal, Calvin Keys (guitar), John Heard (bass), Eddie Marshall (drums), Kenny Nash (congas), Paulino Da Costa (percussion).

References 

1979 albums
Ahmad Jamal albums
Albums produced by Bones Howe
Jazz albums by American artists
20th Century Fox Records albums